The Barrow Upon Soar rail crash occurred on 1 February 2008 some 300 yards north west of Barrow-upon-Soar railway station in the suburbs of Loughborough. A train collided with a bridge which had been accidentally demolished by a lorry.

The lead up
At approximately 06:30 UTC a tipper lorry delivering quarry stone (ballast for track formation) had delivered its load adjacent to the tracks along a railway access road but had not lowered its rear tipping body. This came into contact with the wrought iron pedestrian bridge which crosses the railway, knocking it off its pillars and onto the tracks, by High Street in Barrow on Soar village centre. This blocked all four lines. The Network Rail employee who had been supervising the delivery made an emergency call to the signaller at Leicester power signal box and asked for all train movements to be stopped in the area. The lorry driver immediately notified the police who also told Network Rail.

The crash
The 06:13 East Midlands Trains service running from Nottingham to Norwich received the emergency call as did all of the other trains, however too late; travelling at over  the train could not stop in time and collided with rubble from the footbridge at 06:33 UTC. The train took some 50 yards to stop. All other trains avoided the incident stopping when receiving the call. Six train passengers were hurt, none seriously. The driver suffered worse injuries, having to be cut free and suffering two broken legs. One resident described two huge bangs; the first of the lorry hitting the bridge, the second the train hitting it minutes later.

Reaction
Emergency services were quick to the scene. Fire brigade chief Andy Dermott said about the crash "It was still dark so the driver had no chance to stop in time" He also described the rescue effort "It was a long, slow, painstaking extraction in a difficult, confined space. The rigid construction of the train is not designed for that".

References

External links
Wreckage from the lorry

Railway accidents and incidents in Leicestershire
2000s in Leicestershire
Railway accidents in 2008
2008 in England
Accidents and incidents involving East Midlands Trains